Yalgoo is a town in the Mid-west region,  north-north-east of Perth, Western Australia and  east-north-east of Mullewa. Yalgoo is in the local government area of the Shire of Yalgoo.

Before it was settled as a town the Yalgoo area was used as grazing land for European settlers including the Morrissey and Broad families. Flocks of sheep were herded onto the rich pastures during the wet growing season and driven back to coastal properties for shearing before summer. Over time the graziers saw the value in the Yalgoo land and began to establish the first sheep stations.

History
Gold was discovered in the area in the early 1890s, and by 1895 there were 120 men working the diggings and buildings being erected. The goldfield warden asked for a townsite to be surveyed and gazetted, and following survey the townsite of Yalgu was gazetted in January 1896.

It was once the location of an important railway station (opened in 1896) on the Northern Railway. Yalgoo's importance declined in the years after World War II after the forging of an all-weather road between Wubin and Paynes Find, across Lake Moore.

In early 1898 the population of the town was 650, 500 males and 150 females.

In 1921-22 the priest-architect and parish priest of Yalgoo (as well as of Mullewa), Monsignor John Hawes, designed and built the Dominican convent school and chapel of St Hyacinth: Yalgoo children attended the school until it was closed for lack of pupils in 1950. The timber-framed school building was dismantled and removed. The derelict chapel was restored and re-opened in 1981.

Erection of a state battery commenced in July 1931 and was completed in October of the same year.

Etymology
Yalgoo is an Aboriginal name first recorded for Yalgoo Peak by the surveyor John Forrest in 1876. The name is said to mean "blood" or "place of blood", derived from the word "Yalguru". An alternative view is that it is derived from the Yalguru bush, which abounds in the area and has blood red sap.

The spelling Yalgu was used because of spelling rules for Aboriginal names adopted by the Lands & Surveys Department (the letter "u" best representing the "oo" sound). Within a month the Department of Lands and Surveys had decided reluctantly to use the original Yalgoo spelling, and this spelling has been used ever since. Some doubt about the spelling being officially changed resulted in an amendment from Yalgu to Yalgoo being gazetted in 1938.

Climate
Yalgoo has a hot desert climate (BWk in the Köppen climate classification) with hot summers and mild winters.

Use of name
The name Yalgoo is also used as a name for a crater on the planet Mars, without specifically commemorating the town.

See also 
 Yalgoo bioregion - the ecological region
 Thundelarra
 December 2010 Gascoyne River flood

References

Further reading
 Palmer, Alex. (1985) Yalgoo Fremantle, W.A: Lap Industries. 

Mining towns in Western Australia
Towns in Western Australia
Shire of Yalgoo